Steponas Kairys (1879 in Užnevėžiai near Ukmergė – December 16, 1964 in Brooklyn) was a Lithuanian engineer, nationalist, and social democrat. He was among the 20 men to sign the Act of Independence of Lithuania on February 16, 1918.

Engineering career
Born in the Anykščiai district, then in Imperial Russia, Kairys graduated from the Institute of Technology in Saint Petersburg. Due to conflicts with the academic administration concerning his participation in student clubs and dissident demonstrations, his studies were intermittently interrupted. Following graduation he worked for several years in railroad construction in the Samara and Kursk regions of Russia. He returned to Lithuania in 1912 and worked on city sanitation and water supply systems in Vilnius, and following the Polish occupation of the city left to the temporary capital of Lithuania, Kaunas. After 1923, he taught at the University of Lithuania in Kaunas, where in 1940, he received an honorary doctorate in engineering.

Political career

Kairys joined the Lithuanian Social Democratic Party in 1900. The party had already separated itself from the Russian Social Democrats and sought independence for Lithuania. Kairys was elected to the Central Committee of the party next year and remained in the leadership roles until the party ceased its activities in 1944. During the Russian Revolution of 1905, he participated in the Great Seimas of Vilnius as a member of presidium. The Great Seimas clearly expressed Lithuania's intentions to become an independent state, or at least to gain considerable autonomy from the Russian Empire. 

In 1906, he published the first publications about Japan in Lithuanian, in which, based on the sources, he briefly described the social system and the Constitution of the then Japan, which is why he is often called the first Lithuanian japonologist. 

In 1907, Kairys helped to the 5 Lithuanian social democrats elected to the second Duma write speeches and letters. Before World War I, Kairys worked to promote his party and social democracy.

After the German occupation during the war, Kairys became actively involved with people seeking independence for Lithuania. In 1917 he attended Vilnius Conference where he got elected to the 20-member Council of Lithuania. The council was formed by the conference to declare and establish independence of Lithuania. The task, however, was extremely tough because of the German Wehrmacht presence in the state. The Germans promised to recognize the state if the council agreed to form a firm and permanent federation with Germany. The council issued a declaration to that effect on December 11, 1917. However, Germany did not keep its word and did not recognize the state. The council was torn apart and Kairys with the three others socialists withdrew on January 26, 1918. However, on February 16, 1918 they returned to sign the Act of Independence of Lithuania. The act did not mention anything in specific about relations to Germany.

The council proceeded to negotiate with Germany, which now demanded to void the February 16 decision and recognized the state based on the December 11 declaration. On July 13, 1918, the council, in hopes to avoid being incorporated into a personal union with the Hohenzollern dynasty, elected Mindaugas II as King of Lithuania. This was unacceptable for Kairys and he left the council, this time permanently. However, he remained active in the politics: he was elected to the Constituent Assembly and all three Seimas before the coup d'état of 1926. The authoritarian regime of Antanas Smetona placed Kairys in an opposition.

In exile
After the 1940 Soviet invasion of Lithuania, the Supreme Committee for the Liberation of Lithuania ( or VLIK) was formed and Kairys became its chairman. The organization united people of different political views. In April 1944 majority of the members were arrested by the Gestapo. Kairys changed his name to Juozas Kaminskas and tried to escape to Sweden. Before moving to the United States in 1952, he lived in Germany, where VLIK was revived. Kairys attempted to gain political support for a democratic socialist opposition among other exiles and expatriates. For the last decade of his life, he battled illness and could not fully participate in various political organizations. Two volumes of his memoirs were published. He died in 1964 in New York. Kairys was reinterred in Petrašiūnai Cemetery of Kaunas.

References

Further reading
  
  
  

1879 births
1964 deaths
Lithuanian independence activists
Lithuanian emigrants to the United States
Lithuanian engineers
Lithuanian socialists
Members of the Council of Lithuania
Members of the Executive of the Labour and Socialist International
People from Anykščiai District Municipality
People from Vilkomirsky Uyezd
Academic staff of Vytautas Magnus University
Burials at Petrašiūnai Cemetery
Lithuanian Righteous Among the Nations